Resham Dankh is an Indian soap opera which premiered on 14 August 2006 on STAR One, starring Rahil Azam and Mouli Ganguly in the lead roles. The narrative was adapted from Aatish Kapadia’s Gujarati novel of the same name.  The series was produced by Hats Off Productions.

Plot
The story begins with Aditya Balraj surrendering to the police and confessing to murder. Following his arrest, he decides to write his memoirs in his prison cell, and through these memoirs, we see the story of Aditya Balraj's family.

Aditya is a successful businessman, running a silk manufacturing industry. He is married to Divya. Despite all their happiness, they are unable to have a child even after many years of marriage.

Fortune takes a turn for them when Divya becomes pregnant in the eighth year of their marriage. However, the child is stillborn. As Aditya's brother is about to bury the lifeless child, the baby boy shows signs of life upon getting wet in the rain.

An astrologer then prophesies that the child will have a happy life until he turns five years old, which makes Aditya paranoid about the protection of his child.

The story then moves ahead by five years. Aditya's son, Dev Aditya Balraj has grown up to be a smart boy. Aditya dotes over him and has managed to successfully expand his business over the years. Dev is similarly adored by the full joint family. However, Dev is very eco-friendly and is horrified when he learns of how the silk manufacturing process involves the killing of silkworms.

Dev begins to resent his father. Unable to bear this, Aditya decides to shut down his business. This brings the ire of the family down upon Dev, as they were all dependent on Aditya. The Balrajs nearly go bankrupt and are forced to move into a chawl.

Meanwhile, Aditya continues to research and his team stumbles upon a new process of manufacturing silk, that does not involve the killing of silkworms. Branding it as Ahimsa Silk (English: 'non-violent), Aditya relaunches his business.

Aditya's competitors, some of whom were earlier his associates, suffer from heavy losses due to the widespread adoption of Ahimsa Silk. After finding out that Dev was responsible for this entire series of events, they murder the innocent child.

Aditya is devastated with the loss of his son, and vows to find his son's murderer and avenge him.

Cast
 Rahil Azam as Aditya Balraj
 Mouli Ganguly as Divya, Aditya's wife
 Rajeev Mehta
 Apara Mehta
 Sumeet Raghavan as Aditya's brother
 Sulbha Deshpande as Janki Mausi
 Yash Bhadrani as Dev Balraj, Aditya's son
 Disha Vakani as Kinari
 Puneet Vaishist as Gaurav
 Dimple Shah
 Manava Naik

References

External links

Indian television soap operas
Serial drama television series
2006 Indian television series debuts
2006 Indian television series endings
Star One (Indian TV channel) original programming